Siah Shir (also Romanized as Sīāh Shīr and Seyāh Shīr; also known as Sīāh Shīr-e ‘Olyā and Sīyāh Seīr) is a village in Bahmai-ye Garmsiri-ye Jonubi Rural District, in the Central District of Bahmai County, Kohgiluyeh and Boyer-Ahmad Province, Iran. At the 2006 census, its population was 745, in 118 families.

References 

Populated places in Bahmai County